Globepipona is an afrotropical genus of potter wasps with a single species, Globepipona zairensis.

References

 Carpenter, J.M., J. Gusenleitner & M. Madl. 2010a. A Catalogue of the Eumeninae (Hymenoptera: Vespidae) of the Ethiopian Region excluding Malagasy Subregion. Part II: Genera Delta de Saussure 1885 to Zethus Fabricius 1804 and species incertae sedis. Linzer Biologischer Beitrage 42 (1): 95-315.

Biological pest control wasps
Potter wasps
Monotypic Hymenoptera genera